Dynamite Island is a small, low, rocky island in Back Bay, lying  east of Stonington Island, off the Fallières Coast on the west side of Graham Land. It was first surveyed by the United States Antarctic Service, 1939–41, who referred to it as "Petrel Island", a name not approved because it duplicates an existing name in the Antarctic. The name Dynamite Island was proposed by Finn Ronne, leader of Ronne Antarctic Research Expedition, 1947–48; in 1947 it was necessary to dynamite a passage for the Port of Beaumont, Texas through the ice to the east of this island.

See also 
 Gull Channel
 List of Antarctic and sub-Antarctic islands

References 

Islands of Graham Land
Fallières Coast